KJJK-FM (96.5 FM, "KJ Country") is a radio station broadcasting a country music format serving Fergus Falls, Minnesota.  The station is currently owned by Leighton Broadcasting, through licensee Leighton Radio Holdings, Inc.

The station airs Today's Best Country satellite programming.

The studios and offices are west of downtown Fergus Falls, at 728 Western Avenue North, near I94.

External links
KJ Country website

Country radio stations in the United States
Radio stations in Minnesota
Radio stations established in 1985
Fergus Falls, Minnesota
1985 establishments in Minnesota